In economics, the Dutch disease is the apparent causal relationship between the increase in the economic development of a specific sector (for example natural resources) and a decline in other sectors (like the manufacturing sector or agriculture).

The term was coined in 1977 by The Economist to describe the decline of the manufacturing sector in the Netherlands after the discovery of the large Groningen natural gas field in 1959.

The presumed mechanism is that as revenues increase in the growing sector (or inflows of foreign aid), the given nation's currency becomes stronger (appreciates) compared to currencies of other nations (manifest in an exchange rate). This results in the nation's other exports becoming more expensive for other countries to buy, and imports becoming cheaper, making those sectors less competitive.

While it most often refers to natural resource discovery, it can also refer to "any development that results in a large inflow of foreign currency, including a sharp surge in natural resource prices, foreign assistance, and foreign direct investment".

Model 

The classic economic model describing Dutch disease was developed by the economists W. Max Corden and J. Peter Neary in 1982. In the model, there is a non-tradable sector (which includes services) and two tradable sectors: the booming sector, and the lagging (or non-booming) tradable sector. The booming sector is usually the extraction of natural resources such as oil, natural gas, gold, copper, diamonds or bauxite, or the production of crops, such as coffee or cocoa. The lagging sector is usually manufacturing or agriculture.

A resource boom affects this economy in two ways:
 In the "resource movement effect", the resource boom increases demand for labor, which causes production to shift toward the booming sector, away from the lagging sector. This shift in labor from the lagging sector to the booming sector is called direct deindustrialization. However, this effect can be negligible, since the hydrocarbon and mineral sectors tend to employ few people.
 The "spending effect" occurs as a result of the extra revenue brought in by the resource boom. It increases demand for labor in the non-tradable sector (services), at the expense of the lagging sector. This shift from the lagging sector to the non-tradable sector is called indirect deindustrialization. The increased demand for non-traded goods increases their price. However, prices in the traded good sector are set internationally, so they cannot change. This amounts to an increase in the real exchange rate.

Resource-based international trade 
In a model of international trade based on resource endowments as the Heckscher–Ohlin/Heckscher–Ohlin-Vanek, the Dutch disease can be explained by the Rybczynski Theorem.

Effects 
Simple trade models suggest that a country should specialize in industries in which it has a comparative advantage; so a country rich in some natural resources would be better off specializing in the extraction of those natural resources.

However, other theories suggest that this is detrimental, for example when the natural resources deplete. Also, prices may decrease and competitive manufacturing cannot return as quickly as it left. This may happen because technological growth is smaller in the booming sector and the non-tradable sector than the non-booming tradable sector. Because that economy had smaller technological growth than did other countries, its comparative advantage in non-booming tradable goods will have shrunk, thus leading firms not to invest in the tradables sector.

Also, volatility in the price of natural resources, and thus the real exchange rate, limits investment by private firms, because firms will not invest if they are not sure what the future economic conditions will be. Commodity exports such as raw materials drive up the value of the currency.  This is what leads to the lack of competition in the other sectors of the economy.  The extraction of natural resources is also extremely capital intensive, resulting in few new jobs being created.

Minimization 
There are two basic ways to reduce the threat of Dutch disease: slowing the appreciation of the real exchange rate, and boosting the competitiveness of the adversely affected sectors. One approach is to sterilize the boom revenues, that is, not to bring all the revenues into the country all at once, and to save some of the revenues abroad in special funds and bring them in slowly. In developing countries, this can be politically difficult as there is often pressure to spend the boom revenues immediately to alleviate poverty, but this ignores broader macroeconomic implications.

Sterilization will reduce the spending effect, alleviating some of the effects of inflation. Another benefit of letting the revenues into the country slowly is that it can give a country a stable revenue stream, giving more certainty to revenues from year to year. Also, by saving the boom revenues, a country is saving some of the revenues for future generations. Examples of these sovereign wealth funds include the Australian Government Future Fund, Iranian national development fund, the Government Pension Fund in Norway, the Stabilization Fund of the Russian Federation, the State Oil Fund of Azerbaijan, Alberta Heritage Savings Trust Fund of Alberta, Canada, the Permanent School Fund and Permanent University Fund of Texas, the Alaska Permanent Fund and the Future Generations Fund of the State of Kuwait established in 1976. Recent talks led by the United Nations Development Programme in Cambodia – International Oil and Gas Conference on fueling poverty reduction – point out the need for better education of state officials and energy CaDREs (Capacity Needs Diagnostics for Renewable Energies) linked to a sovereign wealth fund to avoid the resource curse (Paradox of plenty).

Another strategy for avoiding real exchange rate appreciation is to increase saving in the economy in order to reduce large capital inflows which may appreciate the real exchange rate. This can be done if the country runs a budget surplus. A country can encourage individuals and firms to save more by reducing income and profit taxes. By increasing saving, a country can reduce the need for loans to finance government deficits and foreign direct investment.

Investments in education and infrastructure can increase the competitiveness of the lagging manufacturing or agriculture sector. Another approach is government protectionism of the lagging sector, that is, increase in subsidies or tariffs. However, this could worsen the effects of Dutch disease, as large inflows of foreign capital are usually provided by the export sector and bought up by the import sector. Imposing tariffs on imported goods will artificially reduce that sector's demand for foreign currency, leading to further appreciation of the real exchange rate.

Diagnosis 
It is usually difficult to be certain that a country has Dutch disease because it is difficult to prove the relationship between an increase in natural resource revenues, the real-exchange rate, and a decline in the lagging sector. An appreciation in the real exchange rate could be caused by other things such as productivity increases in the Balassa-Samuelson effect, changes in the terms of trade and large capital inflows. Often these capital inflows are caused by foreign direct investment or to finance a country's debt. However, evidence does exist suggesting that unexpected and very large oil and gas discoveries do cause the appreciation of the real exchange rate and the decline of the lagging sector across affected countries on average.

Examples 
 Australian gold rush in the 19th century, first documented by Cairns in 1859.
 Australian mineral commodities in the 2000s and 2010s.
 Signs of emerging Dutch disease in Chile in the late 2000s, due to the boom in mineral commodity prices.
 Azerbaijani oil in the 2000s and 2020s.
 Canada's rising dollar due to foreign demand for natural resources, with the Athabasca oil sands becoming increasingly dominant, hampered its manufacturing sector from the early 2000s until the oil price crash in late 2014/early 2015.
 Indonesia's greatly increased export revenues after the oil booms in 1974 and 1979.
 Kuwaiti oil from the 1960s to present.
 Nigeria and other post-colonial African states in the 1990s.
 The Philippines' strong foreign exchange market inflows in the 2000s leading to appreciation of currency and loss of competitiveness.
 Russian oil and natural gas in the 2000s and 2020s.
 Gold and other wealth imported to Spain and Portugal during the 16th century from the Americas.
 The effect of North Sea oil on manufacturing sectors in Norway and the United Kingdom in 1970–1990.
 Post-disaster booms accompanied by inflation following the provision of large amounts of relief and recovery assistance such as occurred in some places in Asia following the Asian tsunami in 2004.
 Venezuelan oil during the 2000s and 2020s. Using the official exchange rate, Caracas is the most expensive city in the world, though the black market exchange rate is said to be as much as a hundred times as many bolivares to the dollar as the official one. Being a large exporter of oil revenues also keeps the currency's value above what it would otherwise be.
 Analysts have argued that the United Kingdom's increasing reliance on the financial sector since the 'Big Bang' in 1986 is preventing manufacturing growth. A similar argument has been made regarding London's booming property market. This financial sector growth has been concentrated, almost exclusively, on the City of London exacerbating regional economic differences such as the North–South divide – the North previously having a strong industrial and manufacturing base. Paul Krugman (among others) has written about the effect of a strong financial sector on UK manufacturing and a potential readjustment following Brexit, should the financial sector reduce its reliance on London.
 In the United States, the San Francisco Bay Area's reliance on the high technology sector in the 21st century. 

 Ransoms from Somali piracy.

See also 

 Balance of trade
 Price–specie flow mechanism
 Beggar thy neighbour
 Tragedy of the commons
 Resource curse
 Norwegian paradox
 Zero-sum game
 Gentrification
 Rasizade's algorithm

References

Further reading
 
 Elkhan Richard Zada. 2016. Oil Abundance and Economic Growth. Berlin: Logos Verlag.

External links 
 
 CaDRE at energypedia.info/wiki

Macroeconomic problems
Economics catchphrases
The Economist
Economic history of the Netherlands
Foreign direct investment
1970s neologisms
1977 neologisms